Creatonotos leucanioides is a moth of the family Erebidae. It was described by William Jacob Holland in 1893. It is found in Angola, Burkina Faso, Burundi, Cameroon, the Central African Republic, the Republic of the Congo, the Democratic Republic of the Congo, Ethiopia, Gabon, Ghana, Ivory Coast, Kenya, Liberia, Nigeria, Saudi Arabia, Sierra Leone, Sudan, Tanzania, the Gambia, Uganda, Yemen, and Zambia.

The larvae feed on various grasses, including Crotalaria and Capsicum species.

Subspecies
Creatonotos leucanioides leucanioides
Creatonotos leucanioides albidior Wiltshire, 1986 (Ethiopia, Saudi Arabia, Yemen)

References

Spilosomina
Moths described in 1893
Moths of Africa
Moths of the Middle East